Native Indonesians, also known as Pribumi, are Indonesians whose ancestral roots lie mainly in the archipelago, distinguished from Indonesians of known (partial) foreign descent, like Chinese Indonesians (Tionghoa), Arab Indonesians, Indian Indonesians and Indo-Europeans (Eurasians).

Etymology and historical context 
The term  was popularized after Indonesian independence as a respectful replacement for the Dutch colonial term  (normally translated as "native" and seen as derogatory). It derives from Sanskrit terms pri (before) and bhumi (earth). Before independence the term  (Malay: son of the soil) was more commonly used as an equivalent term to pribumi.

Following independence, the term was normally used to distinguish indigenous Indonesians from citizens of foreign descent (especially Chinese Indonesians). Common usage distinguished between pribumi and non-pribumi.  Although the term is sometimes translated as "indigenous", it has a broader meaning than that associated with Indigenous peoples.

The term  (WNI = "Indonesian citizen", keturunan asing = foreign descent), sometimes just WNI keturunan or even WNI, has also been used to designate non-pribumi Indonesians.

In practice, usage of the term is fluid. Pribumi is seldom used to refer to Indonesians of Melanesian descent, such as Moluccans and Papuans, although it does not exclude them. Indonesians of Arab descent sometimes refer to themselves as pribumi. Indonesians with some exogenous ancestry who show no obvious signs of identification with that ancestry (such as former President Abdurrahman Wahid who is said to have had Chinese ancestry) are seldom called non-pribumi. The term bumiputra is sometimes used in Indonesia with the same meaning as pribumi, but is more commonly used in Malaysia, where it has a slightly different meaning.

The term putra daerah ("son of the region") refers to a person who is indigenous to a specific locality or region.

In 1998, the Indonesian government of President B. J. Habibie instructed that neither pribumi nor non-pribumi should be used, on the grounds that they promoted ethnic discrimination.

The Dutch East India Company, which dominated parts of the archipelago from the 17th century, classified its subjects mainly by religion, rather than ethnicity. The colonial administration which took power in 1815 shifted to a system of ethnic classification. Initially they distinguished between Europeans (Europeanen) and those equated with them (including native Christians) and Inlanders and those equated with them (including non-Christian Asians).

Over time, native were gradually shifted de facto into the Inlander category, while Chinese Indonesians, Arab Indonesians and others of non-Indonesian descent were gradually given separate status as Vreemde Oosterlingen ("Foreign Orientals"). The system was patriarchal, rather than formally racial. A child inherited his/her father's ethnicity if the parents were married; the mother's ethnicity if they were unmarried. The off-spring of a marriage between a European man and an Indonesian woman were legally European.

Today, Indonesian dictionary defines pribumi as penghuni asli which translates into "original, native or indigenous inhabitant".

Background 

Pribumi make up about 95% of the Indonesian population. Using Indonesia's population estimate in 2006, this translates to about 230 million people. As an umbrella of similar cultural heritage among various ethnic groups in Indonesia, Pribumi culture plays a significant role in shaping the country's socioeconomic circumstance.

The United States Library of Congress Country Study of Indonesia defines Pribumi as:

There are over 1,300 ethnic groups in Indonesia,

The largest ethnic group in Indonesia are the Javanese people who make up 41% of the total population. The Javanese are concentrated on the island of Java but millions have migrated to other islands throughout the archipelago. The Sundanese, Malay, Batak, and Madurese are the next largest groups in the country. Many ethnic groups, particularly in Kalimantan and the province of Papua, have only hundreds of members. Most of the local languages belong to the Austronesian language family, although a significant number, particularly in North Maluku, Timor, Alor, and West Papua, speak Papuan languages.

The division and classification of ethnic groups in Indonesia is not rigid and in some cases are unclear as the result of migrations, along with cultural and linguistic influences; for example some may agree that the Bantenese and Cirebonese belong to different ethnic groups with their own distinct dialect, however others might consider them to be Javanese sub-ethnicities, as members of the larger Javanese people. The same considerations may apply to the Baduy people who share so many similarities with the Sundanese people that they can be considered as belonging to the same ethnic group. The clearest example of hybrid ethnicity are the Betawi people, the result of a mixture of different native ethnicities that have merged with people of Arab, Chinese and Indian origins since the era of colonial Batavia (Jakarta).

The proportional populations of Native Indonesians according to the 2010 census is as follows:

Smaller groups 

The regions of Indonesia have some of their indigenous ethnic groups. Due to migration within Indonesia (as part of government transmigration programs or otherwise), there are significant populations of ethnic groups who reside outside of their traditional regions.

 Java: Javanese, Sundanese, Betawi, Bantenese, Tengger, Osing, Badui, and others.
 Madura: Madurese
 Sumatra: Batak, Minangkabau, Malays, Acehnese, Lampung, Kubu, and others
 Kalimantan: Dayak, Banjar, Kutai, and others.
 Sulawesi: Makassarese, Buginese, Mandar, Minahasa, Buton, Gorontalo, Toraja, Bajau, Mongondow, Buroko, Bolango, and others.
 Lesser Sunda Islands: Balinese, Sasak, Rotenese, Atoni, and others.
 The Moluccas: Nuaulu, Manusela, Wemale, and others.
 Papua: Dani, Bauzi, Asmat, and others. (see List of ethnic groups of West Papua)

See also 
 Culture of Indonesia
 Ethnic groups in Indonesia
 List of indigenous peoples
 List of Indonesian people
 National costume of Indonesia
 Overseas Indonesians

Non-Pribumi Indonesians
 African Indonesians
 Arab Indonesians
 Chinese Indonesians
 Dutch Indonesians
 Filipino Indonesians
 Indian Indonesians
 Jewish Indonesians
 Pakistani Indonesians

Notes

Further reading 
 
 

Ethnic groups in Indonesia